
Franz Beyer (27 May 1892 – 15 October 1968) was a German general in the Wehrmacht during World War II who held commands at the divisional and corps levels. He was a recipient of the Knight's Cross of the Iron Cross of Nazi Germany.

Awards and decorations
 Iron Cross (1914) 2nd Class (10 October 1915) & 1st Class (16 June 1918)
 Friedrich August Cross 2nd Class with Swords (22 August 1916)
 Bavarian Military Merit Order 4th Class with Swords (20 December 1916)
 Albert Order 2nd Class with Swords (6 December 1917)
 Honour Cross of the World War 1914/1918 (1 November 1934)
 Clasp to the Iron Cross (1939) 2nd Class (13 September 1939) & 1st Class (1 October 1939)
 Knight's Cross of the Iron Cross on 12 September 1941 as Oberst and commander of Infanterie-Regiment 131

References

Citations

Bibliography

 
 
 Blätter für Deutsche und internationale Politik, 12/2006, p. 1462

1892 births
1968 deaths
People from Bautzen
German Army generals of World War II
Generals of Infantry (Wehrmacht)
German Army personnel of World War I
Recipients of the Knight's Cross of the Iron Cross
Recipients of the clasp to the Iron Cross, 1st class
German prisoners of war in World War II
People from the Kingdom of Saxony
Military personnel from Saxony